Hou Renbao (died 981) was a general of the Song dynasty in China.

He was the third son of general Hou Yi (侯益) and married a sister of Zhao Pu. After Zhao's downfall, he was at odds with Zhao's political opponent, Lu Duoxun, and was banished to Yongzhou (邕州, modern Nanning, Guangxi).

At the end of 979, the emperor Đinh Tiên Hoàng and crown prince Đinh Liễn of Đinh dynasty were assassinated. The new emperor Đinh Phế Đế was too young to rule the country, general Lê Hoàn was made regent. Nguyễn Bặc launched a rebellion against Hoàn, and the country the felt into chaos. Hou sent the message to emperor Taizong of Song to encourage him to dispatch an army to invade Đại Cồ Việt (mordern Vietnam). The suggestion was adopted, and Hou was appointed as admiral to invade Đại Cồ Việt. He was defeated by Lê Hoàn at the Battle of Bạch Đằng River and killed in action.

References

981 deaths
Year of birth unknown
Song dynasty politicians from Shanxi
Song dynasty generals
People from Zuoquan County
Song dynasty people killed in battle